Donald Douglas (born 7 March 1933) is a Scottish actor who has appeared in films and many well known television shows.

He was educated at Falkirk High School, Edinburgh College of Art and RADA. His first professional stage appearance was at the Citizens Theatre, Glasgow. He then appeared in repertory theatres in England and on the West End stage.

His film appearances include A Bridge Too Far (1977), Highlander: Endgame (2000) and the role of Admiral Darcy in the Bridget Jones film series.

On television, he played Tsar Alexander I in the 1972 BBC television adaptation of War and Peace, alongside Anthony Hopkins. He starred in the original TV series of Poldark in 1975/6 as Malcolm McNeil, the army captain who frequently allowed his fondness for Demelza Poldark to obstruct his quest to arrest her husband.  He is also remembered by cult TV fans for roles in Doctor Who, Blake's 7,  and The Avengers. His TV career continued into the 1990s, playing Franklin Clarke in the 1992 Agatha Christie's Poirot movie The ABC Murders. He has also played Dr. Gordon McKendrick on several episodes of Monarch of the Glen, and has appeared in episodes of EastEnders, Kavanagh QC and Casualty.

Film and television credits
Film credits include:
Tunes of Glory (1960) - Minor Role (uncredited)
A Bridge Too Far (1977) - Brig. Gen. Gerald Lathbury
Peter and Paul  (1981) - Burrus
Give My Regards to Broad Street  (1984) - Police Detective
Creatures of Light (1992) - Minister
Photographing Fairies (1997) - Judge
What Rats Won't Do (1998) - Diner on Boat
Highlander: Endgame (2000) - Father Rainy
Greenfingers (2000) - Nigel aka Jailbuds
Bridget Jones's Diary (2001) - Admiral Darcy
From Hell (2001) - Hospital Director
Bridget Jones: The Edge of Reason (2004) - Admiral Darcy
En fiende att dö för (2012) - British Admiral (final film role)

Television credits include:
The Avengers, The Morning After (1969) - Major Parsons
Budgie (1971/72) - Tony Pringle, Budgie's brother-in-lawWar and Peace (1972) - Tsar Alexander IDoctor Who, The Sontaran Experiment   (1975) VuralFive Red Herrings aka Lord Peter Wimsey: Five Red Herrings  (1975) - Hugh FarrenPoldark (1975) - Captain Malcolm MacNeilThe Professionals (1977) - Eric SuttonBlake's 7,  Rumours of Death (1980) - Major GrenleeTake the High Road. (1980) - Peter CunninghamSense and Sensibility (1981) - Sir John Middleton
 Goldeneye (1989) - Lord Kemsley Agatha Christie's Poirot - The ABC Murders  (1992) - Franklin ClarkeDiana: Her True Story (1993) - Prince PhilipAlleyn Mysteries, Scales of Justice (1994) - Sir George AlleynEastEnders (3 episodes, 1995) - Hugh AitkenKavanagh QC (2 episodes, 1996–1999) - Mr. Justice HalliwellGoodnight Sweetheart, California Dreamin'  (1999) - AngusSweet Revenge (2001) - Patrick's fatherA Is for Acid (2002) - William McSwanCasualty, Flash in the Pan (2003) - TeddyMonarch of the Glen (3 episodes, 2004–2005) - Dr. Gordon McKendrick

Theatre credits
Theatre credits include:Medea'', Broadway, Longacre Theatre (1994) - Aegeus

References

External links

Scottish male stage actors
Scottish male film actors
Scottish male television actors
Living people
1933 births
Alumni of the Edinburgh College of Art
Alumni of RADA